Emma Margaret Marie Tachard-Mackey  (born 4 January 1996) is a French-born British actress. Her breakthrough performance as Maeve Wiley, a sardonic teenager, in the Netflix comedy-drama series Sex Education (2019–present), earned her a British Academy Television Award nomination. She has since starred in the mystery film Death on the Nile (2022) and in the drama film Emily (2022). Her portrayal of writer Emily Brontë in the latter earned her two British Independent Film Award nominations, and the BAFTA Rising Star Award.

Early life 
Tachard-Mackey was born in Le Mans, the daughter of a French father and an English mother. Her father is a school headmaster. She grew up in Sablé-sur-Sarthe and received her  in 2013 with High Honours in l'académie de Nantes, a French school district, subsequently moving to England to study English language and literature at the University of Leeds. She graduated in 2016. Mackey lives in London as a dual French-British citizen.

Career 
Mackey was cast in her first professional role with the Netflix comedy-drama series Sex Education as Maeve Wiley, an intelligent, quick-witted, business-savvy "bad girl" who convinces fellow student Otis Milburn (Asa Butterfield) to start an underground sex therapy business at their school. She stated that "For me, this is my first piece of work. ... It was—and still is—a really happy time." Mackey's work on the series has earned her acclaim. The Hindustan Times wrote "Emma Mackey, as Maeve, is a revelation; perhaps the best performance by a young British actress I’ve seen since I discovered Florence Pugh. She’s alluring yet distant, pragmatic yet emotional, whip-smart yet foolishly in love." For the role, she received a British Academy Television Award nomination in 2021, and won a National Comedy Award in 2022.

In 2021, Mackey led the independent romantic drama film Eiffel, which premiered at the Alliance Française French Film Festival and has  earned numerous international theatrical releases; it has grossed over $13 million worldwide. Review site DoItInParis stated that Mackey "radiates mischief in the boots of a rebellious and entire provincial bourgeoisie, a bit capricious but madly endearing." The following year, she starred in the mystery thriller film Death on the Nile, a sequel to 2017's Murder on the Orient Express. She was cast in 2019 in the supporting role of Jacqueline de Bellefort. The film earned generally positive reviews and was successful during its release.

Mackey had her first lead film role as the novelist Emily Brontë in the partly fictional 2022 film Emily, focusing on Brontë's early life. She will next appear in Barbie (2023).

Filmography

Film

Television

Awards and nominations

References

External links 

1996 births
Living people
Alumni of the University of Leeds
BAFTA Rising Star Award winners
British film actresses
British people of French descent
British television actresses
French film actresses
French people of English descent
French television actresses
People from Le Mans
People from Sarthe
21st-century British actresses
21st-century French actresses